Oraba is a town in the Koboko District of the Northern Region of Uganda.

Location
The town is in the northwestern corner of Uganda, close to the international borders with South Sudan and the Democratic Republic of the Congo (DRC). It is a few kilometres northeast of the South Sudan–Uganda–DRC tripoint. Oraba is in the West Nile sub-region, directly across the border from the city of Kaya, South Sudan.

The coordinates of Oraba are 3° 32' 6.00"N, 30° 53' 24.00"E (Latitude:3.5350; Longitude:30.8900).

Overview
The Vurra–Arua–Koboko–Oraba Road, whose upgrade to grade II bitumen surface began in 2012 facilitates  the movement of people and goods through this busy trade corridor, serving Uganda, the DRC, and South Sudan.

References

External links
 Planned Infrastructure Projects Between Uganda And South Sudan

Populated places in Northern Region, Uganda
South Sudan–Uganda border crossings
Koboko District